Abdul Aziz Al Ghurair (born 1 July 1954) is an Emirati billionaire businessman. He is the chairman of Mashreq and a director of the Abdullah Al Ghurair Group of Companies, one of the largest business groups in the Middle East, with operations spanning more than 20 countries and business roots stretching back half a century. As of 2019, his net worth was estimated by Forbes to be US$4.8 billion, making him the 420th richest person in the world. In 2015, Al Ghurair pledged one-third of his group's assets, about US$1.1 billion, to the Abdulla Al Ghurair Foundation for Education which seeks to support generations of Emirati and Arab youth by providing them the skills they need to become the future leaders of the region, contributing to the growth and development of their communities.

Education
Al Ghurair trained as an industrial engineer and gained an honours degree from California Polytechnic State University. He joined Mashreq in 1977. He worked in various capacities till 1988 and he took over responsibility for the bank's international operations, setting up branches in New York—US, London—UK, Bahrain, Qatar, Egypt, India and Pakistan. He was appointed Executive Director in 1989 and became CEO the following year.

Career
Al-Ghurair is currently the chairman of Mashreq, a leading financial institution in the United Arab Emirates  founded by his uncle Majed Ahmed AlGhurair during the Gulf's first oil boom in the 1960s. His family has diverse holdings in real estate, cement, contracting, publishing, residential care and petrochemicals, among others. The food division of his holdings, headed by his brother Essa, includes the Middle East's second-largest flour mill and ubiquitous Masafi mineral water. Al Ghurair chairs the Arab Business Angels Network, an organisation that seeks to match angel investment funding with startups by Arab entrepreneurs.

Al Ghurair was the Speaker of the House of the Federal National Council (FNC) in the United Arab Emirates (the UAE Parliament) from 2007 until 2011.

Al Ghurair was also the CEO of Mashreq for almost 30 years  having been appointed to the role in 1990. He steered the bank into becoming a world-class financial services institution.

Driven to lead the UAE banking industry, innovative milestones include Mashreq being the first to launch automated teller machines (ATMs); debit and credit cards; travellers' cheques; consumer loans; Point of sale (POS) terminals; Bancassurance products; mortgages, digital chip enabled credit cards; and the widely popular Mashreq Millionaire rewards-based savings programme.

His endeavours have earned the bank many international accolades, including the 'Best Bank in the UAE' Award 2006 from Euromoney magazine and the MasterCard Product Award for Mashreq UAE E-Gate Prepaid MasterCard card.

Al Ghurair is also the Chairman of Al Ghurair Investment LLC, a diversified industrial group with core focus on Foods, Commodities, Construction and Properties and additionally on Energy, Printing, Retail and Education. Furthermore, he is Chairman of Masafi, Oman Insurance Company, RAK Petroleum, the Endowment Fund and the UAE Banks Federation. He previously sat on the Board of Directors of organizations such as Emaar, Dubai Investments, Visa International, MasterCard, Emirates Foundation, Dubai International Financial Centre, Dubai Chamber of Commerce and Industry and was Co-Chairman of the Arab Business Council – World Economic Forum (WEF).

Al Ghurair is a continuing supporter to many charitable organizations and initiatives in the local and international arenas such as the UNICEF, UNESCO, Planet Finance and the UAE Disabled Sports Federation.

Al Ghurair was part of the highest-level official delegation from the United Arab Emirates ever to visit the Vatican and meet with Pope Benedict and Cardinal Bertone, on 21 October 2008. He also has been honoured with a special Lifetime Achievement Award, at the CEO Middle East Awards.

References

External links

Speakers of the Federal National Council
Emirati chief executives
1954 births
Living people
People from Dubai
Emirati billionaires
Emirati industrial engineers
Emirati businesspeople